The Americas Zone was one of the three zones of the regional Davis Cup competition in 1999.

In the Americas Zone there were four different tiers, called groups, in which teams competed against each other to advance to the upper tier. Winners in Group I advanced to the World Group Qualifying Round, along with losing teams from the World Group first round. Teams who lost their respective ties competed in the relegation play-offs, with winning teams remaining in Group I, whereas teams who lost their play-offs were relegated to the Americas Zone Group II in 2000.

Participating nations

Draw

 relegated to Group II in 2000.
 and  advance to World Group Qualifying Round.

First round

Ecuador vs. Venezuela

Colombia vs. Canada

Bahamas vs. Chile

Second round

Ecuador vs. Argentina

Colombia vs. Chile

First round play-offs

Venezuela vs. Argentina

Bahamas vs. Canada

Second round play-offs

Venezuela vs. Bahamas

References

External links
Davis Cup official website

Davis Cup Americas Zone
Americas Zone Group I